is a town located in Nagano Prefecture, Japan. , the town had an estimated population of 7,147 in 2834 households, and a population density of 110 persons per km². Tateshina is famous for its apple orchards.

Geography
Tateshina is located in the Tateshina Mountainous of central Nagano Prefecture.

Surrounding municipalities
Nagano Prefecture
 Saku
 Chino
 Tōmi
 Ueda
 Nagawa

Climate
The town has a climate characterized by hot and humid summers, and cold winters (Köppen climate classification Dwa).

History
The area of present-day Tateshina was part of ancient Shinano Province, and Ashida-shuku developed as a post station on the Nakasendō highway connecting Edo with Kyoto.  The village of Ashida, Yokotori and Mitsuwa were created with the establishment of the modern municipalities system on April 1, 1889. These three villages merged to form the village of Tateshina on April 1, 1955. Tateshina was raised to town status on October 1, 1953.

Demographics
Per Japanese census data, the population of Tateshina has declined in recent decades.

Education
Tateshina has one public elementary school and one public middle school operated by the town government, and one high school operated the Nagano Prefectural Board of Education.

Transportation

Railway
The town does not have any passenger rail service.

Highway

Sister City
 - Oregon City, Oregon, USA, sister city

Local attractions
Ashida-shuku, post station on the Nakasendo
Lake Megami

References

External links

Official Website 

 
Towns in Nagano Prefecture